Little Manatee River State Park is a  Florida State Park located  south of Sun City, off U.S. Route 301 on Lightfoot Road and along the Little Manatee River. The park was established in 1974 as Little Manatee River State Recreation Area with 663 hectares. It was designated as a state park in March 1999. The Florida Department of Environmental Protection's Division of Recreation and Parks manages that park under a 99-year lease, set to expire April 10, 2074.

Ecology 
A survey of the park's vascular flora was conducted from 1998 and 2000, identifying 523 taxa, 329 genera, and 116 families, of which 436 taxa were native, 88 were introduced, and 29 were endemic to Florida. Ten taxa found within the park are listed as either threatened, endangered, or commercially exploited, including Chrysopsis floridana and Rhynchospora megaplumosa.
Among the wildlife of the park are Florida scrub jays, white-tailed deer, warblers, raccoons,  nine-banded armadillos, bobcats, American alligators and North American river otters.

Operations

Activities include kayaking, canoeing, fishing, and horseback riding, as well as camping, walking, hiking, and wildlife viewing. 

Amenities include a  hiking trail,  of hiking and equestrian trails and four equestrian campsites, a full-facility campground, a primitive campsite along the trail and a youth/group campground. There is a picnic area along the river with tables, grills, and pavilions. The park is open from 8:00 am till sundown year-round.

References

External links

 Little Manatee River State Park at Florida State Parks
 Little Manatee River State Park at Absolutely Florida
 Little Manatee River State Park at Wildernet

Parks in Hillsborough County, Florida
State parks of Florida
1987 establishments in Florida